Gauna phaealis is a species of snout moth in the genus Gauna. It was described by George Hampson in 1906, and is known from New Guinea and Australia.

References

Moths described in 1906
Pyralini